This is a list of South Korean films that received a domestic theatrical release in 2009.

Box office
The highest-grossing South Korean films released in 2009, by domestic box office gross revenue, are as follows:

Released

Notes and references

See also 
 2009 in South Korea
 2009 in South Korean music
 List of 2009 box office number-one films in South Korea

External links 

2009
Box
South Korean